The dark-winged canastero (Asthenes arequipae), or Arequipa canastero, is a species of bird in the family Furnariidae.  It is found in South America in south-western Peru, western Bolivia, and northern Chile.

Taxonomy and systematics
The dark-winged canastero was originally described in the genus Synallaxis. Many authourities still consider the dark-winged canastero as a subspecies of the rusty-vented canastero.

References

dark-winged canastero
dark-winged canastero
dark-winged canastero
dark-winged canastero